Oh Carol! is a Singaporean sitcom produced by local TV station Mediacorp. It aired on Tuesdays 8.30pm (Season 1) and on Wednesdays 8.30pm (Season 2).

Cast
Carol Cheng as Carol Chong
Karen Lim as Mrs Chong (2002)
Vernetta Lopez as Vivian Chong (2003-2004)
Kumar as Sam
Adelina Ong as Wendy
Darren Seah as Jack Chong
Terence Cao as Henry Toh
Natalie Faye as Fiona
Utt Panichkul as Alan

External links
Official Channel 5 Website (Season 1)
Official Channel 5 Website (Season 2)

Singaporean television series
2002 Singaporean television series debuts
2004 Singaporean television series endings
Channel 5 (Singapore) original programming